Urban Science is a worldwide company headquartered in the Renaissance Center, Detroit, Michigan. Urban Science serves nearly every automotive OEM in over 70 countries, throughout their 15 global offices.  Jim Anderson founded Urban Science in 1977, and still leads the company today as President/CEO.

History
In 1977, Cadillac wanted to identify 37,000 car buyers in Chicago on a map and the only way it could be done was manually with push pins. James A. Anderson responded to the request by pioneering an automated mapping process, invented computer generated dot mapping and founded Urban Science to deliver the solution. From that he grew a network planning process; turning the focus on how to optimize the correct number and location of retail outlets.

Subsidiaries
ChannelVantage is a wholly owned subsidiary, formed in 2001 as a strategic alliance between General Motors and Urban Science. The name ChannelVantage supposedly embodies the scope of the services they provide—marketing and distribution "Channel" management—and signifies how they help General Motors Corporation achieve its "Vantage," or as Webster's Dictionary defines it, "a position affording superior power or opportunity."

External links
Urban Science Official Web site
ChannelVantage Official Web site

Automotive companies of the United States